Foel Meirch is a top of Carnedd Dafydd in the Carneddau range in Snowdonia, Wales. It offers commanding views of Carnedd Llewelyn and Yr Elen, and the Ysgolion Duon Cliffs.

References

External links
www.geograph.co.uk : photos of Carnedd Dafydd

Mountains and hills of Snowdonia
Nuttalls
Mountains and hills of Gwynedd
Llanllechid